Mumbai North Lok Sabha constituency (formerly, Bombay City North Lok Sabha constituency) is one of the 48 Lok Sabha (parliamentary) constituencies of Maharashtra state in western India.

Assembly segments
Before delimitation, Mumbai North Lok Sabha constituency comprises Dahisar, Magathane, Borivali, Kandivali, Malad and Goregaon Vidhan Sabha constituencies.

At present, after the implementation of the Presidential notification on delimitation on 19 February 2008, this constituency comprises six Vidhan Sabha (legislative assembly) segments. These segments are:

Members of Parliament

Election results

2019 Lok Sabha

2014 Lok Sabha

2009 Lok Sabha

2004 General Election

1999 Lok Sabha

1957 Lok Sabha

1952 Lok Sabha

(*) stands for 1st Members Candidates of 1952 election 
(^) stands for 2nd Members Candidates of 1952 election

See also
 Mumbai
 List of Constituencies of the Lok Sabha

Notes

External links
Mumbai North lok sabha  constituency election 2019 results details

Politics of Mumbai
Lok Sabha constituencies in Maharashtra
Politics of Mumbai Suburban district
Lok Sabha constituencies in Mumbai